Gangland Landlord is the second studio album by American rapper Mozzy. It was released on October 5, 2018, via Mozzy Records and Empire Distribution. The album is a sequel to his 2015 project Gangland Landscape. Production was handled by fourteen record producers, including David "DaveO" Grear, Jay P Bangz, James Royo, Jay Nari, Juneonnabeat, OG Parker, Ben Billions and Daniel Cruz Beatz. It features guest appearances from A Boogie wit da Hoodie, Blac Youngsta, Caine, Celly Ru, DCMBR, Dej Loaf, E Mozzy, Iamsu!, Rayven Justice, Rexx Life Raj, Schoolboy Q, Teejay3k, Too $hort, Trae tha Truth, Ty Dolla $ign, YFN Lucci, YG, Yhung T.O. and Yo Gotti. The album peaked at number 57 on the Billboard 200.

Track listing

Charts

References

External links

2018 albums
Mozzy albums
Empire Distribution albums
Sequel albums